The  siege of Gaeta was a three-month siege of the Italian city of Gaeta in 1707 by the forces of the Austrian monarchy under Wirich Philipp von Daun, during the War of the Spanish Succession.  It ended on 30 September with the total destruction of the city's historic fortifications.

References

Battles of the War of the Spanish Succession
Battles in Lazio
Conflicts in 1707
1707 in Europe
Gaeta 1707
1707 in Italy
Gaeta
Sieges of the War of the Spanish Succession
Gaeta